The Dracula shrew (Crocidura dracula), also known as the large white-toothed shrew, is a species of mammal in the family Soricidae. It is found in Vietnam, Laos, and adjacent southern China, with possible range extension into Cambodia east of the Mekong River. Because it is so visually similar to the Southeast Asian shrew, it has historically been considered part of the same species complex and the range delineation between the two species is still being resolved. Recent genetic evidence strongly supports that the Dracula shrew is in fact a uniquely diverged species.

Description
The coloring is smoke brown to dark grey black above fading to dark grey below and with dull white feet, the tail is often dark above and lighter below

Ecology
Like other members of the shrew subfamily Crocurinae, the Dracula shrew is an insectivore.

References

Crocidura
Mammals of Asia
Mammals of Southeast Asia
Mammals of Vietnam
Mammals of China
Mammals of Cambodia
Mammals of Laos
Mammals described in 1912